The following is a list of award recipients of Premier Volleyball League (formerly Shakey's V-League), a collegiate women's volleyball league in the Philippines founded in 2004. Starting season 12, a new format for special awards was given. Following the format currently using by the FIVB.

 Award recipients' nationality is indicated in Awardees column; while Team column refers to the team where the awardee played for at the time of receiving the award. Names in boldface denote players from conference champion team.

Most Valuable Player

Best Outside Attacker

Best Opposite Attacker

Best Setter

Best Middle Blocker

Best Libero

Best Foreign Guest Player

Most Improved Player

Defunct Awards

Best Scorer

Best Attacker

Best Server

Best Blocker

Best Digger

Best Receiver

References

External links
 www.v-league.ph - Official website

Shakey's V-League
Lists of volleyball players